Ajit Singh may refer to:

Politicians and rulers
 Ajit Singh (politician) (1939–2021), founder and chief of the Rashtriya Lok Dal party in Uttar Pradesh
 Ajit Singh (Bihar politician), Indian politician
 Ajit Singh (Assam politician), cabinet minister in Assam, India
 Ajit Singh of Khetri (1861–1901), ruler of Khetri, Rajasthan
 Ajit Singh of Marwar (1670s–1724), Maharaja of Marwarlater Jodhpur
 Ajit Singh Kohar, cabinet minister in Punjab, India
 Ajit Kumar Singh (born 1962) (1962–2007), Indian politician of the Janata Dal (United) party
 Ajit Kumar Singh (born 1988), Indian politician of the Communist Party of India (Marxist–Leninist) Liberation party
 Ajit Pratap Singh (1917–2000), Indian politician
 Sardar Ajit Singh (1881–1947), Indian nationalist revolutionary

Sportspeople
 Ajit Singh (cricketer) (born 1993), Indian cricketer
 Ajit Singh (high jumper) (born 1931), Indian Olympic high jumper
 Ajit Singh (racewalker) (born 1936), Indian Olympic racewalker
 Ajit Pal Singh (born 1947), Indian field hockey player
 Ajit Singh (field hockey) (born 1952), Indian field hockey player

Others
 Ajit Singh (economist) (1940–2015), Professor Emeritus of economics at Cambridge University
 Ajit Singh (police officer) (1945–1991), Indian Police Service officer
 Ajit Singh (Sikhism) (1687–1705), eldest son of Guru Gobind Singh
 Ajit Iqbal Singh (born 1943), Indian mathematician
 Ajit Swaran Singh (born 1951), judge in New Zealand